Douglas John Lucia (born March 17, 1963) is an American prelate of the Roman Catholic Church who has been serving as bishop of the Diocese of Syracuse in New York State since 2019.

Biography
Douglas Lucia was born on March 17, 1963, in Plattsburgh, New York. He was ordained a priest by Bishop Stanislaus Brzana for the Diocese of Ogdensburg on May 20, 1989. He holds a Master of Divinity degree from Christ the King Seminary. Lucia studied canon law in Rome from 1997 to 1999 at the Pontifical University of St. Thomas Aquinas.  Lucias served in the diocese as secretary to the bishop, vice chancellor (and later chancellor) and director of vocations.

Bishop of Syracuse
Pope Francis named Lucia to succeed Bishop Robert J. Cunningham as bishop of the Diocese of Syracuse on June 4, 2019. On August 8, 2019, Lucia was ordained to the episcopate at the hands of Cardinal Timothy Dolan, with Bishop Terry R. LaValley and Bishop Cunningham serving as co-consecrators.

In June 2020, Lucia announced that the Diocese of Syracuse would file for Chapter 11 bankruptcy protection,  The diocese was facing hundreds of lawsuits based on sexual abuse allegations. Lucia stated that he wanted to ensure that all the alleged victims received some compensation, although some lawyers said that the diocese was seeking to avoid the lawsuits.

See also

 Catholic Church hierarchy
 Catholic Church in the United States
 Historical list of the Catholic bishops of the United States
 List of Catholic bishops of the United States
 Lists of patriarchs, archbishops, and bishops

References

External links
Roman Catholic Diocese of Syracuse Official Site

 

Living people
1963 births
People from Plattsburgh, New York
Pontifical University of Saint Thomas Aquinas alumni
Roman Catholic bishops of Syracuse
21st-century Roman Catholic bishops in the United States
Bishops appointed by Pope Francis